The Poet Laureate of South Dakota is the poet laureate for the U.S. state of South Dakota. The first poet laureate was appointed in 1937, and a permanent office of poet laureate of South Dakota was created by legislation in 1959. The Governor has the authority to appoint a candidate who has received a recommendation from the South Dakota State Poetry Society. The appointment was indefinite, "during the pleasure of the Governor", until 2015, when the term was set at four years. Past appointees have lifetime emeritus status.

List of Poets Laureate

 Charles "Badger" Clark (1937–1957)
 Audrae Visser (1974-October 2001)
 David Allan Evans (2002–2014, retired)
 Lee Ann Roripaugh (2015–2019)
 Christine Stewart-Nunez (2019–2023)

See also

 Poet laureate
 List of U.S. states' poets laureate
 United States Poet Laureate

References

External links
 South Dakota Poet Laureate at Library of Congress

 
South Dakota culture
American Poets Laureate